Milky is an Italian dance music production group consisting of producers Giordano Trivellato and Giuliano Sacchetto, with Italian singer Giuditta serving as their lead singer on their album Star. Although Giuditta Gazza was the singer on the recordings, a model, the Egyptian-born and German-raised Sabrina Elahl, was used for the music video for the "Just the Way You Are" single. The same model was used for the vinyl cover. Elahl's voice did not appear on any of Milky's recordings, where all songs were sung by Giuditta. Giuditta can be seen on the "Be My World" 12" cover as well as in the video for "In My Mind". Two of the tracks from Star eventually became hits in the United States; "Just the Way You Are" reached the number one position on the Billboard Hot Dance Airplay chart in 2002. The track also reached No. 8 on the UK Singles Chart. In September 2005, "Be My World" peaked at number 6 on the Hot Dance Airplay chart and also charted in Sweden. 

Giuditta also provided the vocals on electronic artist Joe Pacino's song "Miss You So Bad".

Discography

Studio albums

Singles

References

External links
 Profile at Billboard.com (9 July 2003)
 Article about their Dance Airplay number one debut from Billboard.com (17 October 2003)

Italian electronic music groups
Italian house music groups